30 Beats is a 2012 comedy romance film, written and directed by Alexis Lloyd and starring Ingeborga Dapkunaite, Jason Day and Vahina Giocante. Acquired by Roadside Attractions in Feb 2012, the film also stars Paz de la Huerta and Lee Pace. Roadside Attractions released the film theatrically and on Video on demand on June 1, 2012.

Plot 
The plot is set in New York City over three days in the lives of 10 different characters who interact with each other in various sexual encounters which follows from one character to the next.

It begins when a young woman, named Julie (Condola Rashad), meets at a loft with her former anthropology professor, named Adam (Justin Kirk), where she tells him that she is a virgin and wants him to take her virginity.

Afterwards, the plot shifts to Adam who visits a tarot reader, named Erika (Jennifer Tilly), for advice on his sexual prowess and superstitions. She performs a ritual on him to "cleanse" Adam of his sexual needs.

Erika then meets with Diego (Jason Day), a much younger bicycle messenger whom she meets for weekly sexual trysts in a Harlem apartment, where Diego confides in her that he is in love with another woman and Erika gives him advice on how to court her.

Diego then goes to the house of Laura (Paz de la Huerta), the woman he has a fixation on, where she invites him in, but tells him that she cannot have sex, for she has a bad heart and had surgery where she carries a large scar on her chest. Diego tells her to accept her physical deformity as it is to feel accepted.

Laura then goes to her chiropractor, named Matt (Lee Pace) where she dresses up in revealing underwear and tries to seduce him, who at first refuses her advances, but eventually gives into them.

The next day, Matt visits Kim (Vahina Giocante), a young Frenchwoman he is dating, who reveals to him all about her own sexual active life with other men and women and of her comfort with it.

Kim works as a switchboard operator in a local answering service where a regular caller, named Julian (Thomas Sadoski), wants to meet with her for lunch the following day. Unsure of the man he is, Kim has her girlfriend meet with him at a local cafe where she becomes uncomfortable of the way Julian hits it off with the other woman, so she reveals herself. Julian understands Kim being unsure and they end up spending the night together in a threesome with Kim's girlfriend.

Julian is revealed to be a speechwriter who visits a call-girl, named Alice (Ingeborga Dapkunaite), on a weekly basis where she practices bondage acts on him. Alice tells Julien that she is considering giving up her call-girl profession to open her own art gallery and cannot see him anymore. Julian tries to persuade Alice not to give up on what she does best, but her mind is made up, and she walks out to spend alone time in her new artist studio.

Alice goes to a health spa where she meets and has a sexual encounter with a younger man, named Shawn (Ben Levin), in the steam room. Shawn is rushed to the hospital after he slips and hits his head, and cannot remember the sexual encounter due to short-term memory loss. Alice accompanies him to the hospital to tell Shawn that their encounter did happen.

After Shawn leaves the hospital, the events come full circle when he meets with his childhood friend, whom happens to be Julie. He first tells Julie that he wants to have sex with her and Julie disapproves claiming it would be weird since they are best friends. The next day they meet up and Julie decides she wants to try having sex and assumes Shawn is a virgin, he protests and says her reasons yesterday were valid and he is not a virgin but she does not believe it and convinces him to have sex on the rooftop. The final scene is of Julie breaking her red bracelet she shared with her anthropology professor and her holding hands with Shawn while he reads a book.

Cast 
 Condola Rashad as Julie - virgin
 Justin Kirk as Adam - professor
 Jennifer Tilly as Erika - Tarot reader
 Jason Day as Diego - bicycle messenger
 Paz de la Huerta as Laura - heart patient
 Lee Pace as Matt - chiropractor
 Vahina Giocante as Kim - switchboard operator
 Thomas Sadoski as Julian - speech writer
 Ingeborga Dapkunaite as Alice - call girl
 Antone Pagán as the concierge
 Ben Levin as Sean - Julie's friend

Reception
The Hollywood Reporter said of the film, "Clearly aiming for high artistic ground, the film doesn’t even satisfy on an arousal level, with the discreet nudity and endless yakking not exactly proving a turn-on."

References

External links

2012 films
2012 romantic comedy-drama films
2010s English-language films
American erotic romance films
American independent films
American romantic comedy-drama films
2012 independent films
Worldview Entertainment films
Roadside Attractions films
2012 comedy films
2012 drama films
2010s American films